Robert Copeland (born 1981) is a former Australian Football League footballer.

Robert Copeland may also refer to:

 Robert Copeland (theatre manager), early 19th-century theatre manager in Dover, England
 Robert S. Copeland (1800–1885), merchant, shipbuilder and political figure in Nova Scotia, Canada
 Robert W. Copeland (1910–1973), U.S. Navy officer
 Robert Morris Copeland (1830–1874), landscape architect, town planner and Union Army officer in the American Civil War